Kate Bottley ( Stevenson) is a Church of England priest in North Nottinghamshire, a role which she combines with her other roles of journalist, media presenter and reality television star. She appears frequently on British radio and television as well as in newspapers.

Early life and education
Kate Stevenson was born in 1975 in Sheffield, England. She was educated at Walkley Primary School, Myers Grove School, where she was head girl and at Tapton School (sixth form), both state schools in Sheffield. She fell in love at a young age with the son of a local vicar and this led to her interest in the Church of England.

Bottley studied secondary religious education with Qualified Teacher Status (QTS) from 1993 to 1997 at Leeds Trinity & All Saints and then trained to be a religious education teacher in secondary schools. From 1997 to 2000 she worked as an RE teacher at Ecclesfield Secondary School. From 2000 to 2005 she was head of religious education at Yewlands Technology College in Grenoside.

She trained for ordination by being a vicar's personal assistant at St Mark's Church, Grenoside and then studying at St John's College, Nottingham.

Ordained ministry
Bottley was ordained in the Church of England as a deacon in 2008 by George Cassidy and as a priest in 2009. She served her curacy at St Andrew's Church, Skegby in the Diocese of Southwell and Nottingham between 2008 and 2011. From 2011 to 2016, she was chaplain to North Nottinghamshire College, a further education college in Worksop, Nottinghamshire. She also ministered at St Mary and St Martin's Church, Blyth, where she was priest-in-charge from 2011 to 2013 and vicar from 2013 to 2016. From 2016, she was a non-stipendiary associate priest in the Retford Area Team Ministry (now dissolved). On 16 May 2021 she became an Honorary Canon of Southwell Minster.

Media career

Reality television
Bottley has appeared on Channel 4's Gogglebox with her family, as well as Celebrity Mastermind and Celebrity MasterChef.

Channel 4 approached her to appear on Gogglebox following her involvement in a viral video recorded at a wedding in 2013, where she officiated and danced to Kool & the Gang's "Celebration". The video garnered more than 8 million views on YouTube. Bottley appeared on Gogglebox from 2014 to 2016, over five series.

Newspapers
Bottley has written for The Guardian, The Independent, The Times Educational Supplement and Radio Times, on topics of religious faith, television and education.

Radio
Bottley has been a guest contributor on BBC Radio 2's "Pause for Thought" on The Radio 2 Breakfast Show and presented the station's The Sunday Hour programme from 2017 to 2018. Since February 2018, with Jason Mohammad, she presents Good Morning Sunday. She has presented "Prayer for the Day" on BBC Radio 4.

Religious television
Bottley has appeared on BBC One's Songs of Praise. In 2016, she presented BBC One's main Easter programme. She presents the BBC One series "Sunday Morning Stories". Botley co-presented alongside Ashley Jean-Baptise an 8-episode series for BBC Two Stories of Us, visiting people across the UK who lead spiritually and emotionally fulfilled lives.

Gameshows
Bottley has appeared on Channel 4's 8 Out of 10 Cats quiz show as a panellist and on BBC1's Impossible  celebrity version. In November 2019 she appeared on and won Richard Osman's House of Games and she also appeared as a celebrity expert on the 2020 Christmas special of Michael McIntyre's The Wheel. In February 2021, Bottley appeared on S14 E05 of Would I Lie To You?. She has appeared on Celebrity Mastermind.

Other appearances
In November 2021 Bottley was featured in the BBC series Winter Walks, walking in the Yorkshire Dales of Wensleydale and Coverdale, from Jervaulx Abbey to Middleham Castle. Kate won the 2021 edition of The Weakest Link Christmas Special, answering every question correctly and displaying an impressive deviousness in the penultimate round by her choice of voting, ultimately winning £9000 for her chosen charity Baby Basics UK, a grassroots organisation dedicated to providing essentials for parents in poverty.

Personal life
She married Graham Bottley in May 1998 in Sheffield. Together they have two children: one son and one daughter.

References

External links

Good Morning Sunday (BBC Radio 2)

Living people
1975 births
21st-century English Anglican priests
Alumni of Leeds Trinity University
Alumni of St John's College, Nottingham
BBC Radio 2 presenters
English chaplains
English journalists
English radio presenters
English women journalists
People educated at Tapton School
People from Bassetlaw District
Clergy from Sheffield
Television personalities from South Yorkshire
British women radio presenters
Schoolteachers from Yorkshire